Cousolre is a commune in the Nord department in northern France.

The nearest major city is Charleroi in Belgium (the village is very close to the Belgian border).

Heraldry

See also
Communes of the Nord department

References

Communes of Nord (French department)